Bernard Moore may refer to:

 Bernard Moore (poet) (1873–1953), British poet
 Bernard Moore (burgess), sometime member of the Virginia House of Burgesses
 Bernard Moore (potter) (1850–1935)
 Bernard Moore (footballer) (1923–2014), English footballer